William Fitzstephen (also William fitz Stephen), (died c. 1191) was a cleric and administrator in the service of Thomas Becket. In the 1170s he wrote a long biography of Thomas Becket – the Vita Sancti Thomae (Life of St. Thomas).

Fitzstephen had been Becket's personal household clerk for ten years and, when Becket became Chancellor of England, Becket gave his clerk full authority to act in his name in diocesan matters. Fitzstephen became a subdeacon with responsibility for perusing letters and petitions involving the diocese.

Fitzstephen appeared with Becket at the council at Northampton Castle, where the archbishop was disgraced. When Becket was then forced into exile, after refusing to sign the Constitutions of Clarendon, King Henry II accepted a petition, in verse, from Fitzstephen and pardoned him from the banishment meted upon his master. When Becket and the king reconciled, Fitzstephen became his administrator once more. Fitzstephen records that he was among those of Becket's advisors who cautioned against excommunicating king Henry. Fitzstephen was with Becket on the day of Becket's assassination in Canterbury Cathedral in 1170.

Fitzstephen wrote a biography of Becket, in which he gives a clear description of the differences between the archbishop and the King. This also included an account of London in the 12th century, which was included in the biography as a preface, . The three editions of this work demonstrate a continuing familiarity with the life of the city, and for this reason he is not thought to be the same William Fitzstephen whom Henry appointed to be Sheriff of Gloucester and itinerant justice in 1171.

See also
Edward Grim

References 

 Endnotes:
 Materials for the Hist. of Thomas Becket, ed. Robertson (Rolls Ser.), vol. iii. contains Fitzstephen's Vita Sti Thomæ
 Roger of Hoveden, ed. Stubbs (Rolls Ser.), vol. ii.
 Madox's Hist. of the Exchequer (ed. 1769), vols. i. and ii.
 Foss's Judges, vol. i; Wright's Biographia Literaria, vol. ii.
 Hardy's Cat. of Manuscript Materials for Hist. of Great Britain and Ireland, ii.

External links
 VITA SANCTI THOMAE, CANTUARIENSIS ARCHIEPISCOPI ET MARTYRIS, AUCTORE WILLELMO FILIO STEPHANI 1882 edition of the original Latin in Hathi Trust
 An Annotated Translation of the Life of St. Thomas Becket by William Fitzstephen -- Part One, translated from Latin to English by Leo T. Gourde, year 1943
 An Annotated Translation of the Life of St. Thomas Becket By William Fitzstephen -- Part Two, translated from Latin to English by Mary Aelred Sinclair, year 1944
 History of London by William Fitzstephen - a translation
 
 

1191 deaths
Crime witnesses
Year of birth unknown
Anglo-Normans